Meskouta is a traditional Moroccan cake usually served for tea or breakfast. There are different variations of meskouta cakes based on flavors like orange, lemon and vanilla. It was traditionally made in the winter, when oranges ripened. Meskouta is typically served with hot mint tea or coffee.

References 

Moroccan pastry
Moroccan cuisine
Cakes
Citrus dishes
Tea culture
Breakfast dishes